Best Off (stylised as tism.bestoff.) is a compilation album by the Australian alternative rock band TISM, released on 29 July 2002. The album peaked at No. 44 on the ARIA Charts.

Reception
Bronius Zumeris from Beat magazine opined that "Offbeat wit and profanity litter their work" while "Cynics argue that they are a puerile, one joke band trying to flog a dying horse" and the collection "is not a flawless appraisal of their 15 odd years of cultural/musical terror. But it does collate much of the essential TISM for the consumer society."

Track listing

Bonus disc 
Initial copies of the album came with a bonus disc, This Is Serious Mum: A Collection of Bedroom Recordings 1982-1992, containing 25 unreleased bedroom demos spanning TISM's first ten years.

 "The Ballad of the Semitic Nazi" and "Doug Parkinson Sings Christie Allen" previously appeared in excerpt form on Great Truckin' Songs of the Renaissance".
 The full version of "Unknown, Unacknowledged, Unforgettable, Underpants" would later appear as a hidden track on the 2021 remastered reissue of This Is Serious Mum, the band's 1984 demo tape.
 Lyrics from "My Gerontation" reappeared in the 1993 song "Jesus Pots the White Ball" on the band's EP Australia the Lucky Cunt.
 "Tu e La Tua Razza fa'un Culo" (correct Italian: Tu e la tua razza vaffanculo) was sampled in the original 1991 demo recording of "Aussiemandias", included on the iTunes version of the band's 1992 EP The Beasts of Suburban''.

Charts

Release history

References 

TISM albums
2002 greatest hits albums
Compilation albums by Australian artists